The 2006–07 Ottawa Senators season was the 15th season of the Ottawa Senators of the National Hockey League (NHL). This season saw the team rebound from a disappointing early exit from the 2006 playoffs. The team made its first appearance in the Stanley Cup Finals, losing to the Anaheim Ducks. After numerous personnel changes at the start of the season, the team had a poor record until December. The poor record sparked numerous trade rumours in the media. The team turned their play around to place second in the division and won three playoff series to make it to the Stanley Cup Final, the first in Ottawa in 80 years.

The line of Daniel Alfredsson, Jason Spezza and Dany Heatley would lead the way with impressive offensive totals. In the playoffs, the line led the team to three series wins. In the Final, the line was shut down by the superior defence and goaltending of Anaheim and the team lost the series four games to one. Alfredsson would lead all scorers in the playoffs.

Off-season

In July 2006, the Senators lost four players to free agency; defencemen Zdeno Chara (who signed with the Boston Bruins), Brian Pothier (who signed with the Washington Capitals), goalie Dominik Hasek (who signed a one-year deal with the Detroit Red Wings) and forward Vaclav Varada (who signed with HC Davos of the Swiss Elite League).

Former Carolina Hurricanes starter Martin Gerber was signed to fill the void left by Hasek, and Ottawa also signed defenceman Joe Corvo, formerly of the Los Angeles Kings. A short time later, they traded star forward Martin Havlat and centre Bryan Smolinski to the Chicago Blackhawks for Tom Preissing, Josh Hennessy, Michal Barinka and a second-round draft pick in 2008.

The club signed Russian centre Alexei Kaigorodov to a two-year, entry-level contract. They also signed blueliner Jamie Allison and re-signed Antoine Vermette, Chris Neil and Peter Schaefer to avoid arbitration proceedings. In addition, Ottawa re-signed Chris Kelly and Jason Spezza to two-year contracts each, as well as Christoph Schubert. 

Having to decide between one of their two star defensemen. Wade Redden was ultimately the choice over Zdeno Chara based on his impressive past couple of seasons. In the 2005–06 season, Redden was selected for the Canadian Olympic team, along with teammate Dany Heatley, and finished the season with a career-high 50 points and an NHL-leading +35 plus-minus rating in 65 games. The Senators chose Redden and the Senators and Redden agreed on a two-year contract worth $13 million with a no-trade clause; Chara signed with the Boston Bruins. Redden's salary made him the highest paid player on the team and the media and fans expected another top-notch season.

Regular season
The goaltending duty was platooned between Ray Emery and Martin Gerber at first. Gerber struggled and Emery eventually won the starting job.

Highlights
After starting with a 17–18–1 record by December 21, Ottawa played better from that point on (31–7–8).

On January 3, 2007, Ottawa acquired centre Mike Comrie from the Phoenix Coyotes in exchange for prospect Alexei Kaigorodov. Ottawa was in need of another centre due to injuries and was eager to shed Kaigorodov, who was suspended for refusing an assignment to the Senators' American Hockey League affiliate, the Binghamton Senators, instead opting to play in Russia.

Dany Heatley was the representative for Ottawa at the 2007 All-Star Game for the East, managing a 94.0 MPH slapshot in the skills competition and a goal and two assists in the East's 12–9 loss to the West. For the YoungStars Game, sophomore defenceman Andrej Meszaros and forward Patrick Eaves participated.

On February 22, 2007, the Senators were involved in a huge brawl with the Buffalo Sabres over an alleged late hit by the Senators' Chris Neil on Sabres' co-captain Chris Drury. Although the referees ruled it was a legal hit (and replays and analysts concurred after the game), a fight ensued after play restarted. Eight players were assessed a total of 100 penalty minutes, and five players, including Senators Ray Emery and Chris Phillips, were ejected.  The Senators lost the match, 6–5, in a shootout, one of a record eight overtime games and four shootouts that night.

Midway through the season, the Senators acquired centre Mike Comrie and left wing Oleg Saprykin from the Phoenix Coyotes. They would also acquire defenceman Lawrence Nycholat from the Washington Capitals.

The team finished second in the Northeast Division, behind the Presidents' Trophy-winning Buffalo Sabres, and third in the Conference in points (the team was seeded fourth due to the precedence of divisional winners). Because the Montreal Canadiens and the Toronto Maple Leafs both narrowly missed the playoffs, the Senators were the only Canadian-based team in the Eastern Conference to qualify for the playoffs. They also tied the Canadiens for most shorthanded goals scored during the regular season, with 17.

Season standings

Schedule and results

October

November

December

January

February

March

April

 Green background indicates win.
 Red background indicates regulation loss.
 White background indicates overtime/shootout loss.

Playoffs

The Ottawa Senators ended the 2006–07 regular season as the Eastern Conference's fourth seed.

The Senators started the playoffs against the fifth-seeded Pittsburgh Penguins, whom they defeated four games to one. The second-seeded New Jersey Devils were their next opponent, with the same four-games-to-one result, again in favor of the Senators. In the Eastern Conference Final, the Senators faced the top-seeded Buffalo Sabres. Once again, Ottawa won in five games, which gave the Senators their first-ever trip to the Stanley Cup Finals. This was also the Sens' first series win against the Sabres.

Finals

The Anaheim Ducks were the Senators' opponents in the Finals and the four-games-to-one result stayed the same for the Senators, the only difference being this time it was in the opposing team's favor. The Ducks were successful in shutting down the Senators's top line to the point where it was broken up in game five. All games were close except for game five which the Senators lost 6–2, when two goals went in off Senators defencemen and Chris Phillips caused an own-goal, which turned out to be the game-winning and Cup-winning goal attributed to Travis Moen, and possibly the only such goal in Finals history. Daniel Alfredsson was the Senators' top forward in the series as he had been all playoffs, scoring four goals. Dany Heatley and Jason Spezza were held to one goal and two assists in total.

Key contributors
After a poor start to the season, several players picked up their play and the Senators played well from December to the Stanley Cup Finals. The defence pairing of Chris Phillips and Anton Volchenkov won praise from the media for their "shutdown effectiveness" against opposing top lines. The 'CASH line' of Spezza, Heatley, and Alfredsson was outstanding offensively, scoring nearly half of the Senators' goals in the post-season, appearing on The Hockey News cover for their play. The line tied for the NHL and team scoring lead with 22 points in 20 playoff games. Goaltender Ray Emery played all 20 games and posted 13 wins.

Eastern Conference Quarter-final: vs. (5) Pittsburgh Penguins

Ottawa wins series 4–1

Eastern Conference Semi-final: vs. (2) New Jersey Devils

Ottawa wins series 4–1

Eastern Conference Final: vs. (1) Buffalo Sabres

Ottawa wins series 4–1

Stanley Cup Final: vs. (W2) Anaheim Ducks

Anaheim wins series 4–1
 Green background indicates win.
 Red background indicates loss.

Player statistics

Regular season
Scoring

Goaltending

Playoffs
Scoring

Goaltending

Awards and records
 Molson Cup – Ray Emery
 Prince of Wales Trophy
 First NHL All-Star team – Dany Heatley

Transactions

Trades

Free agents acquired

Free agents lost

Lost on waivers

Draft picks

Ottawa's picks at the 2006 NHL Entry Draft in Vancouver, British Columbia.

Notes:
 The 3rd-round pick used to select Eric Gryba was acquired in a trade from the Boston Bruins.

Farm teams
 Binghamton Senators (American Hockey League)
 Charlotte Checkers (ECHL)

See also
 2006–07 NHL season

References

 Game log: Ottawa Senators game log on espn.com
 Team standings: NHL standings on espn.com

External links
 Official website of the Ottawa Senators

Ottawa Senators seasons
Ottawa Senators season
Eastern Conference (NHL) championship seasons
Ottawa
Ottawa Senators
Ottawa Senators
Ottawa